Hyperiopsidae is a family of amphipods, comprising the genera Hyperiopsis and Parargissa.

References

Gammaridea
Crustacean families